Governor's House may refer to:

Governor's House (Peshawar), Pakistan
Governor's House (Karachi), Pakistan
Governor's House (Lahore), Pakistan
Governor's House, Ufa, Russia
Governor's House, Edinburgh, Scotland
Governor's House, Knutsford, Cheshire, England
Governor's House (Togus, Maine), United States
Governor's House (Governors Island), New York
Delaware Governor's Mansion, sometimes called Governor's House

See also
Governor's house in Medan, Indonesia
Governor's Mansion (disambiguation)
Old Governor's Mansion (disambiguation)
List of governors' mansions in the United States
Governor's Palace (disambiguation)
Belmond Governor's Residence, Yangon, Myanmar, the former home of British governors of Burma
Government House
Official residence